John P. Vinich was an American Democratic politician and attorney who served as a member of the Wyoming Legislature from 1975 to 1999. He served in the Wyoming House of Representatives from 1975 to 1983, and then in the Wyoming Senate from 1983 to 1999. He was the Democratic nominee for the U.S. Senate in 1988, and almost defeated incumbent Republican Senator Malcolm Wallop. He was also the Democratic nominee for Congress in the 1989 special election to replace Dick Cheney, and for Governor of Wyoming in 1998, losing both races by wider margins.

References

External links
 Wyoming State Legislature - Senator John Vinich Legislative Profile

1950 births
2004 deaths
20th-century American politicians
Democratic Party members of the Wyoming House of Representatives
Democratic Party Wyoming state senators